Heydon may refer to:

Places
Heydon, Cambridgeshire
Heydon, Norfolk
Hedon (UK Parliament constituency), East Riding of Yorkshire, sometimes spelt Heydon

Other uses
Heydon (surname)
Heydon Prowse (born 1981), British comedian

See also
Heydon Hall, Norfolk
Heydon's Case (1584), a landmark case
Haden (disambiguation)
Haydon (disambiguation)
Heyden (disambiguation)